Dakota High School can refer to
Dakota Collegiate, Winnipeg, Manitoba, Canada
Dakota Junior Senior High School, Dakota, Illinois, United States
Dakota High School (Fargo, North Dakota), Fargo, North Dakota, United States
Dakota High School (Michigan), Macomb Township, Michigan, United States
:Category:High schools in South Dakota
:Category:High schools in North Dakota